Augusta Lundin (13 June 1840 in Kristianstad – 20 February 1919) was a Swedish fashion designer. She is considered to be the first international Swedish fashion designer as well as the first well known fashion designer in Sweden.

Early years and education
Born to tailor Anders Lundin and Christina Andersdotter in Kristianstad, she learned the profession as a child, along with her sister, Hulda Lundin.

Career
She later moved to Stockholm, where she was employed at the Emma Hellgren hatshop in 1863–65 and the fashion studio of C L Flory & co in 1865–67. In 1867, she started her own fashion studio, and in 1874, she made her first study trip to Paris, and started her own fashion paper.

Lundin made study trips to Paris once a year. She introduced the French method of making every part of a dress separately to Sweden. In 1886, she designed a "reformed costume", a loose dress without corset or bustle, on commission of the reform dress society, which desired a more healthy dress model for women.

Among her clientele were Selma Lagerlöf, Josephine of Leuchtenberg and Sophie of Nassau, as well as international clients, especially in Denmark, Norway, Finland and the Russian Empire. King Oscar II of Sweden gave away her dresses as Christmas gifts every year to the lady-in-waitings at the royal court. On 31 October 1892, she was made official dressmaker of the queen, Sophia of Nassau; at assignments for the court, she brought models to the royal palace to display the clothes.

Lundin was known as a good employer: she was an honorary member of the dressmaker's society (1880) and aware that seamstresses often damaged their backs and eyes at work, she instigated a 12-hour work shift and a two-week summer vacation (1890), something quite unique for an employer in Sweden at a time when few employers allowed for vacations at all. She employed only women until 1910.

At her death in 1919, she left the company to her siblings' children. In the 1920s, the company experienced difficulties because of the simplified fashion and the confection industry; it was closed in 1939.

Gallery

References

Bibliography
 Tydén-Jordan, Astrid (1987). Kungligt klädd, kungligt mode, Stockholm:Berg. 
 Augusta Lundin, urn:sbl:9861, Svenskt biografiskt lexikon (art av Gunhild Engholm), hämtad 2015-01-06.
 Du Rietz, Anita, Kvinnors entreprenörskap: under 400 år, 1. uppl., Dialogos, Stockholm, 2013

Further reading

External links

1840 births
1919 deaths
Swedish fashion designers
19th-century Swedish businesspeople
People from Kristianstad Municipality
Swedish women business executives
Swedish tailors
Swedish women fashion designers
19th-century Swedish businesswomen